To Sell the Truth is a studio album by the American punk rock band Youth Brigade, released in 1996. This was the band's only album so far recorded as a four-piece, adding future Social Distortion member Jonny "2 Bags" Wickersham as the second guitarist. As of today, it is the band's most recent studio album released under the Youth Brigade name, although they did record six new tracks on the 1999 split album BYO Split Series Volume II.

Track listing
All songs written by  Shawn Stern, except where noted.
 "It's Not My Fault" - 2:38
 "Spies for Life" - 2:57
 "Sick"  - 3:27
 "We're In!" (Shawn Stern, Jonny Wickersham) - 2:14
 "Breakdown" (Shawn Stern, Adam Stern) - 2:04
 "Street Dominator" (Adam Stern) - 1:56
 "Shrinking" - 2:11
 "Believe in Something" - 3:55
 "Friends" - 2:26
 "Not Gonna Take It" (Shawn Stern, Mark Stern) - 2:25
 "My Bartender" (Adam Stern) - 1:54
 "Tomorrow" (Martin Charmin, Edward C. King, Charles Strouse, Mark Weitz, Wickersham) - 1:58
 "Last Day of the Year" - 1:51
 "I Hate My Life" - 2:48
 "What She Said" - 1:45  (The Smiths)  (Hidden track)

Personnel
 Shawn Stern − guitars, vocals
 Jonny "2 Bags" Wickersham − guitars, vocals
 Adam Stern − bass, vocals
 Mark Stern − drums, vocals

1996 albums
Youth Brigade (band) albums